Tour of Zhoushan Island is a women's staged cycle race which takes place in China and is currently rated by the UCI as 2.2.

Winners

References

 
Cycle races in China
Women's road bicycle races
Spring (season) events in China